The Public Oversight, Accounting and Auditing Standards Authority (KGK) is a government organization in Turkey with responsibility for regulation of determining auditing standards and ethics, authorizing independent auditors and audit companies under a public oversight system and monitoring their activities within the frame of quality assurance in the process of EU negotiations.

References

External links
 

Accounting organizations
Organizations based in Ankara
2011 establishments in Turkey
Regulatory and supervisory agencies of Turkey
Accounting in Turkey